Listen to the Man is a song by George Ezra

Listen to the Man, live album from Harry Belafonte discography
"Listen to the Man", single by The Troggs 1973